Saint-Étienne-sur-Suippe (literally Saint-Étienne on Suippe) is a commune in the Marne department in north-eastern France.

Geography
The Suippe forms part of the commune's eastern border, flows westward through the middle of the commune, then forms part of its western border.

See also
Communes of the Marne department

References

Saintetiennesursuippe